Throwaway Kids was a two-part investigative report airing on the ABC News television series 20/20 in 1981.

The report followed a nine-month undercover investigation by producers Karen Burnes and  Bill Lichtenstein. The reports detailed the documented abuse, neglect, and preventable deaths among children, the aged, and those with mental illness who were in the care and custody of the Oklahoma Department of Human Services.

The main focus of the reports were the state's "warehousing" of children, many of whom were in state custody for being abused or abandoned.  In turn, the state received per diem federal funds for each child in its custody, but it failed to provide appropriate services for the children with the revenue.

At the time of the program, Oklahoma had no foster care system, so children who were abandoned, abused, neglected, or in need of supervision, were placed in large, outmoded, state-run institutions, many of which were located in rural towns of the state, and were without services or proper care.  Lichtenstein and Burnes obtained thousands of pages of confidential "Abuse Reports," generated by state workers and kept by the Department of Human Services, detailing the mistreatment of children in state's custody, ranging from children being beaten by often unqualified staff, to kids being locked in isolation for weeks at a time. There were also numerous unexplained deaths at the state hospital for children with mental retardation, which the investigation showed were the result of neglect and abuse by state workers.

Burnes and Lichtenstein were part of a team of reporters who collaborated on the investigation, which included ABC's Sylvia Chase, Pulitzer Prize-winners John Hanchette and Carlton Sherwood of Gannett News Service, and the investigative team from local TV station KOCO, which was an ABC affiliate and was owned by Gannett. This unprecedented investigation, involving national and local broadcast and print reporters, culminated with articles published by Gannett, a special two-part report on 20/20, "Throwaway Kids," produced by Burnes and Lichtenstein, and a series, "Oklahoma Shame," which aired locally in Oklahoma City on KOCO-TV. The series was honored with a 1982 Peabody Award and a National Headliner Award, and was nominated for a national news Emmy Award.

In 1982, only months after the reports ran, Lloyd E. Rader Sr., the director of the Oklahoma Department of Human Services, resigned after 31 years with the department amidst a state investigation of financial misconduct involving patronage, illegal corporate hirings and abuse of the state bid system.  In particular, Rader was accused of using state funds to hire private detectives to follow and harass the reporters investigating the Department of Human Services, and that he had used state workers to build a clinic for his son, Lloyd Rader, Jr., a doctor.  The investigative team also uncovered what Rader referred to as his 130-page "legislative control file," containing the favors and patronage he had given to leading representatives in the state, up through Gov. George Nigh and U.S. Senator David Boren.

Today, the Oklahoma Department of Human Services has almost eight thousand employees and a budget of $1.4 billion from state and federal funding. Currently the Department is involved in another lawsuit, with the advocacy group "Children's Rights," over its treatment of juveniles in state custody.

References 

ABC News
History of Oklahoma